Grundberg is a surname. Notable people with the surname include:

Betty Grundberg (born 1938), American politician
Helena Grundberg (born 1972), Swedish figure skater
Svante Grundberg (1943–2019), Swedish actor, author, director, and stand-up comedian

See also
Grünberg (surname)